Fort Sill National Cemetery is a United States National Cemetery located in the city of Elgin in Comanche County, Oklahoma. Administered by the United States Department of Veterans Affairs, it encompasses , and as of 2021 had more than 8,000 interments.

History 
Fort Sill was established in 1869, in what was then Indian territory, by Major General Philip H. Sheridan, and named in honor of Brigadier General Joshua W. Sill, who died at the Battle of Stones River. The area around Fort Sill served as a reservation for displaced Native American groups. Apache Chief Geronimo lived the last days of his life, and died at Fort Sill, as did Kiowa Chief Kicking Bird.

Fort Sill National Cemetery was dedicated on November 2, 2001, it was the second National Cemetery built in the state of Oklahoma. The first stage of development of the cemetery finished in 2003. It is an expansion to the smaller 9-acre burial area located about ten miles south at Fort Sill. The Fort Sill Post Cemetery has had 7,140 interments since 1869.

References

External links 
 National Cemetery Administration
 Fort Sill National Cemetery
 
 

Cemeteries in Oklahoma
Protected areas of Comanche County, Oklahoma
United States national cemeteries